Couto may refer to:

Surname
Couto  is a common surname in the Galician and Portuguese language, namely in Portugal, Galicia and Brazil. Its meaning is game reservation or feudal land. Sometimes a diminutive form occurs, . It is a name associated with a great number of different people:
André Couto, (born 1976) Portuguese/Macanese racing driver
Eric Couto, Executive Director of Wisconsin Progress (c. 1978-Present), founding member of Meat Knights
Fernando Couto, (born 1969) Portuguese football player
Grant Andrew DeCouto, (born 1995), American producer
Mia Couto, (born 1955) Mozambican writer
Maria Aurora Couto, Goan Catholic writer, historian and educationalist
Maria do Couto Maia-Lopes, (1890-2005) longest-lived person to be documented in Portugal
Gago Coutinho, (1869-1959) Portuguese aviation pioneer
Vasco Fernandes Coutinho, 1st Count of Marialva (c. 1385-1450), Marshal of Portugal
Vasco Fernandes Coutinho, captain of Espírito Santo (1490-1561), founder of the Brazilian state of Espírito Santo

Places
Couto (Santa Cristina), in Santo Tirso, Portugal.
Couto (São Miguel), in Santo Tirso, Portugal.
Couto do Mosteiro, in Santa Comba Dão, Portugal
Couto de Esteves, in Sever do Vouga, Portugal
Couto (Barcelos), in Barcelos, Portugal
Couto de Baixo, in Viseu, Portugal
Couto, in Abegondo, Galicia.
Couto de Riba, in Alfoz, Galicia
Couto, in Gomesende, Galicia
Couto de Abaixo, in Vigo, Galicia
Couto de Cima, in Viseu, Portugal
Couto, in Pantón, Galicia
Couto (Arcos de Valdevez), in Arcos de Valdevez, Portugal
Couto de Magalhaes de Minas, in Minas Gerais, Brazil
Couto, Resendes do Ponta Delgada, Portugal

Portuguese-language surnames